H. "Bill" Nuttall was an American Negro league pitcher in the 1920s.

Nuttall pitched for the Havana Reds in 1923. He joined the Bacharach Giants in June 1924 along with Alex Evans after Arnett Mitchell was released. The following season, he played for the Bacharach club again as well as for the Lincoln Giants, then finished his career for the Lincoln club in 1926.

References

External links
 and Seamheads

Year of birth missing
Year of death missing
Place of birth missing
Place of death missing
Bacharach Giants players
Lincoln Giants players